Edward Lee Knight 1971–2001 is the third and final album by rapper Big Ed the Assassin. It was released posthumously on August 21, 2001 through his own Special Forces Records label.

Track listing 

2001 albums
Big Ed albums